The Cello Concerto in E major was created by the cellist Gaspar Cassadó, who took nine of Pyotr Ilyich Tchaikovsky's pieces from his Piano Pieces, Op. 72, and orchestrated them as, collectively, a concerto.

The pieces Cassadó used were: Scene dansante (Invitation au trepak), Tendres Reproches, and Chant Elegiaque in the first movement; Meditation and Dialogue in the second; and Danse Characteristique, Berceuse, Passe Lointain, and Impromptu in the third. 

This concerto was a favorite of Cassadó's, but he never recorded it.  No other recording of the work exists.

References
 Ginzburg, Lev. History of the Violoncello. New Jersey: Paganiniana Publications, 1983.

Cello concertos
Compositions by Gaspar Cassadó